John Verwey (born July 27, 1957), nicknamed The Walrus, is a Canadian retired professional darts player who currently in Professional Darts Corporation and British Darts Organisation tournaments.  During a 25-year career, he has enjoyed numerous wins competing in his native Ontario, Canada, going on to represent the province at the national level on four occasions.  In 2005, Verwey earned a spot in the PDC World Darts Championship where he lost in the third round to Colin Lloyd.

Career
Verwey honed his innate darts talent most of his youth but hadn't yet turned professional until around the mid-nineties, where he met with some success for the first time at the Canada National Championships. Primarily renowned as a singles champion, John Verwey often forayed into the doubles scene, alongside fellow darts player and spouse, Heather.

Verwey was defeated by Colin Lloyd in the 2005 World Darts Championship.

Verwey is currently unranked, and as such, receives no benefit of sponsorship as many professional darts players often do.

Personal
Verwey is a dual-ticketed millwright and electrician and currently operates a laboratory at the Bruce Nuclear Generating Station near Port Elgin.  He maintains a sprawling farm estate in Auburn, Ontario, with his wife, three children and relatives.

World Championship Results

PDC
 2005: Last 32 (lost to Colin Lloyd 1–4)

See also 
John Part
John Lowe
Darts

References

External links
http://www.clintonnewsrecord.com/PrintArticle.aspx?e=1940098

1957 births
Canadian darts players
Sportspeople from Toronto
Living people
People from Huron County, Ontario
Professional Darts Corporation associate players